Proatta is a  Southeast Asian genus of ants in the subfamily Myrmicinae. It contains the single species Proatta butteli, known from the Malay Peninsula, Borneo and Sumatra.

Biology
Due to morphological similarities with the fungus-growing ants, Emery (1922) placed the genus within the tribe Attini. Weber (1958) attributed the shared similarities to convergent evolution, and Bolton (2003) finally moved the genus to Stenammini. Unlike the attines of the New World, Proatta species are predators and scavengers, and while fungus may grow in refuse piles in the nest, the ants do not actively cultivate fungus.

References

Emery, C. (1922). "Hymenoptera. Fam. Formicidae. Subfam. Myrmicinae. [part]." Genera Insectorum 174B: 95-206.
Forel, A. (1912). "Descriptions provisoires de genres, sous-genres, et espèces de Formicides des Indes orientales." Revue Suisse de Zoologie 20: 761–774.

External links

Myrmicinae
Monotypic ant genera
Hymenoptera of Asia